Hervey Bay is an electoral district of the Legislative Assembly in the Australian state of Queensland. The electorate is centred on the city of Hervey Bay and also includes Fraser Island (K'gari, Gari).

Members for Hervey Bay

Election results

References

External links
 

Hervey Bay
Hervey Bay